Godlewo Wielkie  is a village in the administrative district of Gmina Nur, within Ostrów Mazowiecka County, Masovian Voivodeship, in east-central Poland.

References

Godlewo Wielkie